Gayla Earlene (born January 31, 1954 in Inola, Oklahoma), is a Christian country music recording artist and musician.

Biography
Earlene began her professional career at the age of 16 as a singer/songwriter. In 1971, she met and married fellow artist and steel guitarist, Gene Crain. Together they formed the group Pure Country and began touring across the country. Earlene has performed on the Grand Ole Opry with other artist such as, Roy Clark, Freddy Fender, Minnie Pearl, Johnny Russell and Mel Tillis. Through the years Earlene has had major success in the Christian country market. She has amassed over fourteen number one songs and has been awarded the industries highest honors of Female Vocalist and Entertainer of the Year on several occasions.
When Earlene and her husband are not touring, the couple run a feed store called Crain Feed and Farm Supply in Skiatook, Oklahoma. They formed the company in 1975.

Discography
Gayla has recorded many albums through the years that has contained many of the number one songs she has been noted for.

Selected albums

Number ones

Honors and awards 
Earlene received the Video of the Year award with the Artists Music Guild's 2012 AMG Heritage Awards for her work on the Hands of Hope project.

References

External links
Gayla Earlene's Official Website
Gene Crain's Official Website

Living people
American women country singers
American country singer-songwriters
1954 births
Country musicians from Oklahoma
People from Rogers County, Oklahoma
Singer-songwriters from Oklahoma
21st-century American women